The 2020 FIA World Rallycross Championship was the seventh season of the  FIA World Rallycross Championship, an auto racing championship recognised by the Fédération Internationale de l'Automobile (FIA) as the highest class of international rallycross.

Johan Kristoffersson won the Drivers' Championship for the third time. KYB Team JC won the Teams' Championship.

Calendar
The 2020 championship was contested over eight rounds in Europe. The season was originally scheduled to start in April but following multiple postponements relating to the COVID-19 pandemic, a revised calendar was released in May 2020 and the championship finally began in August.

Calendar changes
The World RX of Portugal and World RX of Germany would both have returned after a one-year hiatus. The German round would have moved from the Estering to the Nürburgring. Both events were later cancelled.
The World RX of Canada and the World RX of Great Britain were both removed from the schedule.
The World RX of Russia was added to the schedule, but had been cancelled.
 The World RX of Barcelona - Catalunya, World RX of Portugal, World RX of Benelux, World RX of Sweden, World RX of Germany were all scheduled to take place between April and August. All were rescheduled as a result of the COVID-19 pandemic.
 The World RX of Norway and World RX of South Africa were both dropped from the calendar following the May calendar revision.
 The World RX of France was cancelled, also as a result of the COVID-19 pandemic.
 A new event was added to the calendar, after the extraordinary World Motor Sport Council in June, in Kouvola (Finland) to replace the World RX of France.
 The World RX of Benelux was rescheduled for a second time to November to allow a larger number of spectators to attend.
 On September 15, the organization of World RX of Portugal announced that the event was cancelled due to the evolution of COVID-19 in September.
 On November 4, it was announced that the World RX of Benelux was cancelled due to spikes in COVID-19 cases in Belgium.
 On November 26, it was announced that the World RX of Germany was cancelled, due to spikes in COVID-19 cases in Germany, resulting in an early end to the 2020 season

Entries

Supercar

RX2

Projekt E

Championship Standings
World Championship points are scored as follows:

A red background denotes drivers eliminated from that round.

Supercar

FIA World Rallycross Championship for Drivers

FIA World Rallycross Championship for Teams

RX2 Series

Projekt E

References

External links 

World Rallycross Championship seasons
World Rallycross Championship
FIA World Ralycross Championship